Edmundo Suárez Trabanco (22 January 1916 – 14 December 1978) was a Spanish football player and coach – better known as Mundo. He was born in Barakaldo. He played as a centre-forward for Spanish club Valencia CF for most of his career, except for his last season, where he played for CD Alcoyano.

Club career
Mundo initially played football with various amateur teams in his native Basque Country, but the Spanish Civil War changed his career completely. He had a contract with Athletic Bilbao but this acquisition was made in republican territory, therefore it was not considered valid by the pro-Franco state which remained in power after the War. In 1939, the pro-Franco army created a team, named "Recovery of Levante" formed diverse players who had fought in the military region of Levante. Said team was chosen by Valencia CF as its first opponent after the war, and after seeing 'Recovery of Levante' in action, the established club did not waste the opportunity and acquired all of its players. 

After this acquisition, Mundo stayed in Valencia for eleven seasons between 1939–40 and 1949–50. His great physical strength allowed him to dominate Spanish football during the 1940s.

Mundo is considered an idol for fans of Valencia because he holds, by a considerable margin, the record for the highest number of goals scored for the club with 238 in the two major domestic competitions, obtaining an average of 0.92 goals per game. He won the Pichichi Trophy (top scoring player) in the 1941–42 and 1942–43 seasons, with 27 and 28 goals respectively. He is currently the tenth highest goal scorer in the history of the Spanish league (with the fifth-highest goals-per-game ratio), and the sixth highest goalscorer in the history of the Copa del Rey. 

After a season in which he played only six games, he decided to leave Valencia to join in the nearby, smaller club Alcoyano which was also in the first division. He remained there for the 1950–51 season, until he realised he was no longer able to play at the top level.

International career
Suárez earned three international caps with the Spain national football team between 1941 and 1942, scoring three goals. His international debut was on 28 December 1941 against Switzerland.

Coaching career
During the 1963–64 season, Suárez returned to Valencia and took up the position of team coach, replacing Pasieguito, another legend of Valencian football. Thanks to his strong character and tactical flexibility, he went on to improve Valencia's league position, placing them in sixth place. The team's performance in the Fairs Cup was much better, but they lost against Real Zaragoza in a controversial match. After the positive results of that year, the Valencia FC board of directors allowed him to coach for one more year. However, as the team finished the league in fourth place, the directors hired another coach, Barinaga. With Barinaga, the team did not reach its expectations, so Mundo returned to his old position as coach for the next season.

He started the 1966–67 season as the team's coach and achieved great success, winning the Copa del Rey by beating Athletic Club 2–0 in the final. His remained Valencia's coach until 13 October 1968, when he ended his coaching career due to the team's poor performance.

Club statistics

Honours

Player

Club
Valencia CF
 La Liga: 1941–42, 1943–44, 1946–47
 Copa del Rey: 1941, 1949
 Copa Eva Duarte: 1949

Individual
 2 Pichichi trophy for the highest goalscorer of the season in the Spanish league: 1941–42, 1943–44

Manager
Valencia CF
 1 Copa del Rey: 1967

References

External links

 Mundo in www.lfp.es
 Profile

1916 births
1978 deaths
Spanish footballers
Footballers from Barakaldo
Association football forwards
La Liga players
Valencia CF players
CD Alcoyano footballers
Pichichi Trophy winners
Spain international footballers
Spanish football managers
La Liga managers
Segunda División managers
Hércules CF managers
Real Zaragoza managers
UE Lleida managers
Xerez CD managers
Barakaldo CF managers
Sporting de Gijón managers
Valencia CF managers
Real Murcia managers
Levante UD managers
CF Gandía managers
Valencia CF Mestalla managers